This is a timeline of television coverage of basketball in the United Kingdom.

1980s and 1990s
From the late 1970s, the BBC shows highlights of the National Championship finals, airing the coverage Grandstand. 

 1982
 8 November – The newly launched Channel 4 shows live sport for the first time when it broadcasts coverage of a match from Division One of the National Basketball League. It shows highlights of the first half of the game and live coverage of the second half. 

 1983 to 1992
 No events.

 1993
 1 March – Screensport closes following its merger with Eurosport in the hope that one would become financially profitable. The channel had shown regular coverage of the NBA since the mid 1980s.

 1994
 No events.

 1995
 September – Sky Sports starts showing a weekly game from the British Basketball League. 

 1996
 Sky Sports, which had taken over from Screensport as UK broadcaster of the NBA, ends its coverage of the American game.

 1997
 30 March – Channel 5 launches and it broadcasts live American sport on weeknights, including games from the NBA.

 1998
 17 January – The BBC shows live coverage of the National Cup final.

 1999
 No events.

2000s 
 2000
 No events.

 2001
 May – Sky loses the rights to the British Basketball League to ITV.

 2002
 The closure of ITV Digital sees coverage of the BBL end as no other broadcaster picks up the rights to the league. This resulted in a loss of exposure for the sport in the UK and in a significant loss of income to member clubs. 
 5 December – NASN launches to show live and recorded coverage of North American sports which includes coverage of the National Basketball Association (NBA) and National Collegiate Athletic Association (NCAA)'s basketball tournaments.

 2003
 12 January – The BBC shows live coverage of what was to ht the last national Cup. This brought to an end the BBC's coverage of live domestic basketball, having shown this event sncne 1998.

 2004
 No events.

2005
 No events.

 2006
 No events.

 2007
 No events.

 2008
 February –  Setanta Sports begins broadcasting one live BBL game a week. 

 2009
 1 February – NASN is renamed ESPN America following the sale in late 2006 of the channel to ESPN.
 June  – Channel 5’s coverage of the NBA ends.

2010s
2010
 The British Basketball League returns to Sky Sports after a 9-year gap and broadcasts the league for the next three seasons.

2011
 No events.

2012
 No events.

2013
6 October – The British Basketball League's own subscription-based online TV station BBL TV launches, and during the 2013–14 season match highlights were also televised and featured on British Eurosport each week.
 1 December – BT Sport shows its first NBA match, thereby adding professional basketball to its broadcasting of the college game which it shows as part of its coverage of the NCAA.

2014
 No events.

2015
 No events.

2016
 February – The British Basketball League signs a two-year broadcast deal with the BBC, featuring both British Basketball League and Women's British Basketball League games. The games are to be mostly broadcast on the BBC Sport website with the showpiece finals also being broadcast on the BBC Red Button.

2017
 No events.

2018
 June – BT Sport shows the NBA for the final time ahead of the rights transferring to Sky Sports.
 October – The NBA returns to Sky Sports after around a decade with ESPN and BT Sport.

2019
 No events.

2020s
 2020
 3 December – The British Basketball League returns to Sky Sports. The broadcaster shows 30 games per season. The deal also sees Sky broadcasting matches from the Women's British Basketball League.

 2021
 No events.

2022
 No events.

References

Basketball on UK television
Basketball on UK television
Basketball on UK television
Sports television in the United Kingdom
Basketball on UK television
Basketball in the United Kingdom